Justice Mohammad Fazlul Haque (Fojlul Hoq) (born 30 June 1938) is a former High Court judge of Bangladesh served as the advisor of the non-partisan caretaker government of Bangladesh in 2007.

Caretaker government
Fazlul Haque was appointed as one of the ten advisers of the non-party caretaker government of Bangladesh under the leadership of President and Chief Advisor Iajuddin Ahmed on October 31, 2006, the equivalent of a government Minister, holding multiple portfolios.

During the political crisis in late 2006 when the Chief Adviser acted out of his own accord and decided to hold elections anyway even if Awami League didn't contest, Justice Haque, along with other advisers, repeatedly held meetings fruitlessly with Awami League leaders to ensure fair elections in the January 22, 2007. although he did not resign en masse with the four advisers to protest against the difference in opinion with the Chief Adviser.

When the Chief Adviser finally consented to resign from office on January 11, 2007, Justice Haque was appointed the new chief of the caretaker government until a replacement was available. The replacement, Dr Fakhruddin Ahmed was available in a day, on January 12, thus completing the shortest tenure of a head of government in Bangladesh.

During 2007 and 2008, he was investigated and charged by the Anti-Corruption Commission in a bribery scandal, which lasted at least through 2010. His son confessed to corruption to the Truth and Accountability Commission.

References

1938 births
Prime Ministers of Bangladesh
Living people
Advisors of Caretaker Government of Bangladesh